Trish Ranson (born November 23, 1969) is an American politician who has served in the Oklahoma House of Representatives from the 34th district since 2018. She was reelected in 2020 and is currently running again in 2022. A former educator, Ranson is a member of the Democratic Party.

References

1969 births
Living people
Democratic Party members of the Oklahoma House of Representatives
21st-century American politicians
21st-century American women politicians
Women state legislators in Oklahoma